Tymur Rustamov (born 8 March 1989) is a retired Ukrainian football defender.

Career
In the championship of Ukraine (DUFL) he played for the teams Slavutych, Yunist Chernihiv and Desna Chernihiv, where he played a total of 53 matches and scored 19 goals. He made his professional debut in the 2005/06 season in a match between Desna Chernihiv and Brzezany's Sokol, and at the end of the season Timur won gold medals in the Second League of Ukraine.

The player spent most of his career in various clubs of the first and second leagues of Ukrainian football. In particular, in such clubs as Desna (Chernihiv), Skala (Stryi), Niva (Ternopil) and Obolon-Brovar (Kyiv). With the latter he became a silver medalist of the Second League of Ukraine.

In the winter of 2016 he moved to Bukovyna. On December 1, 2016, he stopped cooperating with the Chernivtsi team. At the end of February 2017, he signed a contract with Obolon-Brovar (Kyiv), but left the team in June of the same year.

References

External links
 on Official website of FC Chernihiv

1989 births
Living people
People from Slavutych
Ukrainian footballers
Association football defenders
FC Yunist Chernihiv players
SDYuShOR Desna players
FC Desna-2 Chernihiv players
FC Desna Chernihiv players
FC Bukovyna Chernivtsi players
FC Obolon-Brovar Kyiv players
FC Nyva Ternopil players
FC Skala Stryi (2004) players
Sportspeople from Kyiv Oblast